The 2018 BRD Bucharest Open was a tennis tournament played on outdoor clay courts. It was the fifth edition of the tournament and part of the International category of the 2018 WTA Tour. It was held from 16 to 22 July 2018 at the Arenele BNR in Bucharest, Romania.

Points and prize money

Point distribution

Prize money

Singles main-draw entrants

Seeds 

 1 Rankings as of 2 July 2018.

Other entrants 
The following players received wildcards into the singles main draw:
  Miriam Bulgaru
  Andreea Roșca
  Elena-Gabriela Ruse

The following players received entry using a protected ranking into the singles main draw:
  Laura Siegemund

The following players received entry from the qualifying draw:
  Irina Bara
  Çağla Büyükakçay
  Claire Liu
  Rebecca Šramková

Withdrawals
Before the tournament
  Sara Errani → replaced by  Ons Jabeur
  Kaia Kanepi → replaced by  Ysaline Bonaventure
  Monica Niculescu → replaced by  Viktoriya Tomova
  Yulia Putintseva → replaced by  Jasmine Paolini
  Carla Suárez Navarro → replaced by  Vera Zvonareva

Retirements
  Polona Hercog

WTA doubles main-draw entrants

Seeds 

 Rankings are as of July 2, 2018

Other entrants 
The following pairs received wildcards into the doubles main draw:
  Irina-Camelia Begu /  Andreea Mitu
  Anna Bondár /  Miriam Bulgaru

Champions

Singles 

  Anastasija Sevastova def.  Petra Martić, 7–6(7–4), 6–2

Doubles 

  Irina-Camelia Begu /  Andreea Mitu def.  Danka Kovinić /  Maryna Zanevska 6–3, 6–4

References

External links 
 
 

Bucharest Open
BRD Bucharest Open
2018 in Romanian tennis
Bucharest Open